Las amiguitas de los ricos ("The Girlfriends of the Rich") is a 1967 Mexican film. It stars Sara García.

External links
 

1967 films
Mexican comedy-drama films
1960s Spanish-language films
1960s Mexican films